The 2017–18 season is Fenerbahçe's 60th consecutive season in the Süper Lig and their 110th year in existence.

Transfers

In

Out

Total spending:  €17,680,000

Total income:  €18,750,000

Expenditure:  €1,070,000

Players

First team squad

Statistics

Pre-season and friendlies

Pre-season

Mid-season

Competitions

Overview

Süper Lig

League table

Results summary

Pld = Matches played; W = Matches won; D = Matches drawn; L = Matches lost; GF = Goals for; GA = Goals against; GD = Goal difference; Pts = Points

Results by round

Matches

Turkish Cup

Fifth round

Round of 16

Quarter-finals

Semi-finals

Final

UEFA Europa League

Third qualifying round

Play-off round

References

Fenerbahçe S.K. (football) seasons
Fenerbahce